Aurora Chancayllo is a Peruvian football club, playing in the city of Chancay, Huaral, Lima, Peru.

History
The club was founded on August 10, 1931.

In the 1968 Copa Perú, the club classified to the Final Stage, with the Sport Chorrillos of Talara, Carlos A. Mannucci of Trujillo, Cienciano of the Cusco, FBC Melgar of Arequipa and Colegio Nacional de Iquitos. In the final stage, the club finalized in last place.

In the 1999 Copa Perú, the club classified to the Regional Stage, but was eliminated by Estudiantes de Medicina of Ica and Somos Aduanas of the Callao.

In the 2000 Copa Perú, the club classified to the Regional Stage, but was eliminated by Estudiantes de Medicina.

In the 2001 Segunda División Peruana, the club was relegated to the Copa Perú.

In the 2014 Copa Perú, the club classified to the National Stage, but was eliminated by Sport Loreto in quarterfinals.

Honours

Regional
Región IV:
Winners (1): 2014
Runner-up (1): 1999

Liga Departamental de Lima:
Winners (4): 1967, 1999, 2000, 2014

Liga Provincial de Huaral:
Winners (4): 1996, 1997, 1999, 2014

Liga Distrital de Chancay:
Winners (6): 1996, 1997, 1998, 1999, 2000, 2014
Runner-up (1): 2018

See also
List of football clubs in Peru
Peruvian football league system

References 

Football clubs in Peru
Association football clubs established in 1931
1931 establishments in Peru